Priscilla Cherry (born 9 August 1971) is a Mauritian judoka. She competed in the women's middleweight event at the 1996 Summer Olympics.

References

External links
 

1971 births
Living people
Mauritian female judoka
Olympic judoka of Mauritius
Judoka at the 1996 Summer Olympics
Place of birth missing (living people)
African Games medalists in judo
Competitors at the 1995 All-Africa Games
African Games gold medalists for Mauritius